Francis Eyles may refer to:

Sir Francis Eyles, 1st Baronet (died 1716), Governor of the Bank of the England
Francis Eyles (died 1735) (1679–1735), MP for Devizes
Francis Eyles (died 1750) (1704–1750), MP for Devizes
Francis Haskins Eyles-Stiles (died 1762), British landowner

See also
Eyles